The District Football Associations are the local governing bodies of association football in Sweden. District FAs exist to govern all aspects of local football in their defined areas, providing grassroots support to the Swedish Football Association by promoting and administering football, futsal and beach soccer in their respective districts.

Most of the 24 District FAs align roughly with the boundaries of the historic Provinces of Sweden, although Stockholm FA and Gothenburg FA cover the two major cities and their immediate conurbations.

The District FAs administer youth football and the lower tier leagues from Division 4 (men) and Division 3 (women), respectively, and further below.

The 24 district organisations are as follows:

Blekinge Fotbollförbund
Bohusläns Fotbollförbund
Dalarnas Fotbollförbund
Dalslands Fotbollförbund
Gestriklands Fotbollförbund
Gotlands Fotbollförbund
Göteborgs Fotbollförbund
Hallands Fotbollförbund
Hälsinglands Fotbollförbund
Jämtland-Härjedalens Fotbollförbund
Medelpads Fotbollförbund
Norrbottens Fotbollförbund
Skånes Fotbollförbund
Smålands Fotbollförbund
Södermanlands Fotbollförbund
Stockholms Fotbollförbund
Upplands Fotbollförbund
Värmlands Fotbollförbund
Västerbottens Fotbollförbund
Västergötlands Fotbollförbund
Västmanlands Fotbollförbund
Ångermanlands Fotbollförbund
Örebro Läns Fotbollförbund
Östergötlands Fotbollförbund

Footnotes

External links 
Swedish Football Association (official website)

 
Football governing bodies in Sweden
Sweden